This is a list of events from British radio in 1963.

Events
6 January – Alan Freeman takes over as presenter of Pick of the Pops; he remains with the programme until the BBC ceases to broadcast it in 1972, and then with revivals.
19 February – Actress Ellis Powell is dismissed from the leading role of Mrs Dale in the BBC Light Programme soap opera The Dales, which she has played since the first episode in 1948, and it is given to former musical actress Jessie Matthews; Powell dies 3 months later aged 57.
29 September–December – Don Moss joins Alan Freeman to host Pick of the Pops.
23 November – 20th anniversary of the first broadcast of the British Forces Broadcasting Service.
Richard Imison is appointed Script Editor for BBC Radio Drama, a position he holds until 1991.

Continuing radio programmes

1940s
 Music While You Work (1940–1967)
 Sunday Half Hour (1940–2018)
 Desert Island Discs (1942–Present)
 Family Favourites (1945–1980)
 Down Your Way (1946–1992)
 Have A Go (1946–1967)
 Housewives' Choice (1946–1967)
 Letter from America (1946–2004)
 Woman's Hour (1946–Present)
 Twenty Questions (1947–1976)
 Any Questions? (1948–Present)
 The Dales (1948–1969)
 Billy Cotton Band Show (1949–1968)
 A Book at Bedtime (1949–Present)

1950s
 The Archers (1950–Present)
 Listen with Mother (1950–1982)
 From Our Own Correspondent (1955–Present)
 Pick of the Pops (1955–Present)
 The Clitheroe Kid (1957–1972)
 My Word! (1957–1988)
 Test Match Special (1957–Present)
 The Today Programme (1957–Present)
 The Navy Lark (1959–1977)
 Sing Something Simple (1959–2001)
 Your Hundred Best Tunes (1959–2007)

1960s
 Farming Today (1960–Present)
 Easy Beat (1960–1967)
 In Touch (1961–Present)
 The Men from the Ministry (1962–1977)

Births
6 January – Julian Worricker, radio and television journalist
14 January – Adjoa Andoh, film, television, stage and radio actress
4 April – Graham Norton, actor, comedian, television presenter, columnist and broadcaster
2 May – Esther Freud, novelist and broadcaster
19 May – Michael Symmons Roberts, poet and radio dramatist
20 May – Jenny Funnell, radio and television actress
26 May – Simon Armitage, poet laureate and broadcaster
June – Philip Middlemiss, radio and television actor
7 June – Lesley Douglas, BBC radio executive, Controller of Radio 2 and 6 Music from 2004–2008
2 July – Mark Kermode, film critic
30 October – Wendy Robbins, radio and television presenter and producer
3 November – Ian Wright, footballer and radio and television presenter
28 November – Armando Iannucci, Scottish broadcast and film writer-producer and presenter
Unknown
Shola Adewusi, stage, screen and radio actress
Lynn Bowles, BBC Radio 2 travel presenter
Jeremy Rees, radio presenter

Deaths
10 March – Lindley Fraser, Scottish-born academic economist and broadcaster (born 1904)
18 March – Peter Eckersley, pioneering radio engineer (born 1892)
10 May – Stanley Maxted, war reporter and actor (born 1895)

See also 
 1963 in British music
 1963 in British television
 1963 in the United Kingdom
 List of British films of 1963

References

 
Radio
Years in British radio